Xu Anqi (born 23 January 1992) is a Chinese right-handed épée fencer.

Xu is a two-time individual Asian champion, four-time team Asian champion, and two-time team world champion.

A three-time Olympian, Xu is a 2016 team Olympic silver medalist and 2012 team Olympic champion.

Xu competed in the 2012 London Olympic Games, the 2016 Rio de Janeiro Olympic Games, and the 2020 Tokyo Olympic Games.

Medal Record

Olympic Games

World Championship

Asian Championship

Grand Prix

World Cup

References

External links

1992 births
Living people
Sportspeople from Nanjing
Fencers at the 2012 Summer Olympics
Fencers at the 2016 Summer Olympics
Olympic gold medalists for China
Olympic fencers of China
Olympic medalists in fencing
Chinese épée fencers
Chinese female fencers
2016 Olympic silver medalists for China
Medalists at the 2012 Summer Olympics
Asian Games medalists in fencing
Fencers at the 2010 Asian Games
Fencers at the 2014 Asian Games
Asian Games gold medalists for China
Asian Games silver medalists for China
Asian Games bronze medalists for China
Medalists at the 2010 Asian Games
Medalists at the 2014 Asian Games
Nanjing Sport Institute alumni
Fencers from Jiangsu
Fencers at the 2020 Summer Olympics
21st-century Chinese women